Rowan Damming (born 5 September 2004 in 's-Hertogenbosch) is a Dutch professional squash player. As of November 2022, he was ranked number 174 in the world.

References

Living people
Dutch male squash players
Year of birth missing (living people)